Cyclohexanehexathione is a cyclic covalent compound consisting of a six-carbon ring with a sulfur bonded to each. It has been generated by neutralization of its monoanion in a mass spectrometer. This compound is the thioketone analog of cyclohexanehexone; that oxygen variant is expected to be substantially less stable.

{|
|+style="caption-side:bottom" | Proposed valence isomers of cyclohexanehexathione
|-
| 
| 
| 
|}

This theoretical analysis of the various isomers and experimental analysis of this reaction cast doubt on whether the mass spectrometric approach really did produce the hexathione isomer as originally claimed. The increased stability of dithietes as compared to dioxetane-like rings is one of theoretical bases for proposing  is more stable than the oxygen analog.

References 

Inorganic carbon compounds
Inorganic sulfur compounds
Thioketones